Horst Rick (19 December 1936 - 14 July 2012) was a professional soccer player who played as a midfielder in the German American Soccer League and the International Soccer League. He also earned one cap with the United States national team.

Professional career
Rick was with Fortuna Düsseldorf, Eintracht Braunschweig and SSV Reutlingen in the German Oberliga from 1958 through 1963. In 1964, Rick played for New York Hota of the German American Soccer League. He then spent the 1965 International Soccer League with the New Yorkers.

National team
Rick earned his one cap with the national team in a 10–0 loss to England on 27 May 1964.

References

External links

American soccer players
United States men's international soccer players
German-American Soccer League players
International Soccer League players
New York Hota players
Eintracht Braunschweig players
Fortuna Düsseldorf players
SSV Reutlingen 05 players
1936 births
2012 deaths
German footballers needing infoboxes
Association football midfielders